Andrew Cranston (born 22 July 1969) is a Scottish painter. His work has been reviewed and discussed in various publications such as The Guardian and The Spectator.

Personal life 
Andrew Cranston was born on 22 July 1969 in Hawick in the Scottish borders. He has 3 children, his partner is also a famous painter. He pursued his studies as an artist at Grays School of Art in Aberdeen, earning his BA followed by an MA in Painting at the Royal College of Art in London.

Career 
Andrew Cranston returned to Grays School of Art after graduating and lectured there in the Painting department from 1997 until 2017. He now lives and works in Glasgow and continues to pursue his career as a painter, represented by the Ingleby Gallery in Edinburgh and Karma in New York. In 2014, he was awarded the Arts Foundation fellowship by the Royal Scottish Academy.

In his practise as a painter, one of the recurring themes of his work is making paintings of rooms described in works of literature or fiction. A good example of this can be found in his work Illustration for a Franz Kafka story (2nd version), made in 2007, where he depicts the bedroom of Gregor Samsa as described in Kafka's Metamorphosis.

Exhibitions 
Andrew Cranston exhibited work at East International in 2007 and had a solo exhibition at International Project Space in Birmingham entitled What a Man Does in the Privacy of his Own Attic is his Affair in 2009.

But the dream had no sound (27 October - 21 December 2018) is the largest exhibition of Cranston's work of his career to date, that took place at the Ingleby Gallery in Edinburgh. The work, a series of paintings on hardback book covers, was described by the Scotsman as drawing its inspiration from post-impressionism, reminiscent of artists such as Bonnard, Vuillard, Seurat or Signac.

References

Scottish painters
Alumni of Gray's School of Art
Alumni of the Royal College of Art
Royal Scottish Academicians
1969 births
Living people